Alessio Castro-Montes (born 17 May 1997) is a Belgian professional footballer who plays for Gent.

Career
He started his football career at Gelmen V.V. under the coaching of his father, where also his three year older brother played. He was soon noticed by a scout from Standard Liège and shortly after moved to the club where he played for seven years. He later moved to R.S.C. Anderlecht.

On 17 June 2019, Eupen announced that they had sold Castro-Montes to K.A.A. Gent.

Personal life
Castro-Montes was born in Belgium to a Spanish father and a Belgian mother.

Career statistics

References

External links
 Soccerway Profile

1997 births
Living people
People from Sint-Truiden
Belgian footballers
Belgian people of Spanish descent
Belgian Pro League players
K.A.S. Eupen players
Sint-Truidense V.V. players
K.A.A. Gent players
Association football midfielders
Footballers from Limburg (Belgium)